The 1996–97 Eastern Counties Football League season was the 55th in the history of Eastern Counties Football League a football competition in England.

Premier Division

The Premier Division featured 20 clubs which competed in the division last season, along with three new clubs:
Bury Town, relegated from the Southern Football League
Gorleston, promoted from Division One
Warboys Town, promoted from Division One

Also, Felixstowe Town changed name to Felixstowe Port & Town.

League table

Division One

Division One featured 13 clubs which competed in the division last season, along with five new clubs:
Cambridge City reserves
Cornard United, relegated from the Premier Division
Haverhill Rovers, relegated from the Premier Division
Maldon Town, transferred from the Essex Senior League
Needham Market, joined from the Suffolk & Ipswich League

League table

References

External links
 Eastern Counties Football League

1996-97
1996–97 in English football leagues